The Fox is a 1967 Canadian drama film directed by Mark Rydell. The screenplay by Lewis John Carlino and Howard Koch is loosely based on the 1923 novella of the same title by D. H. Lawrence. The film marked Rydell's feature film directorial debut.

Plot
Jill Banford and Ellen March struggle to support themselves by raising chickens on an isolated farm in rural Canada. Dependent Jill tends to household chores and finances while the self-sufficient Ellen deals with heavier work, such as chopping wood, repairing fences, and stalking the fox that keeps raiding their coops, although she is hesitant about killing it. Jill seems content with their secluded existence, but the frustrated Ellen is less enchanted by the solitude.

In the dead of winter, merchant seaman Paul Grenfel arrives in search of his grandfather, the former owner of the farm who died one year earlier. With nowhere else to go while on leave, he persuades the women to allow him to stay with them for a few weeks in exchange for helping with the work. Tension among the three slowly escalates when his attention to Ellen arouses Jill's resentment and jealousy.  When he proposes marriage to Ellen, Jill is first outraged, then hysterically fearful, even trying to bribe Paul to leave.

Eventually Paul tracks and kills the fox. Just before his departure, he makes love to Ellen and asks her to elope with him, but she confesses she would feel guilty if she abandoned Jill. After Paul returns to his ship, Jill confesses her feelings for Ellen, and the two women make love.  Ellen writes to Paul, explaining that her place is with Jill and that she cannot marry him.

Several weeks later, Paul returns unexpectedly as the two women are chopping down a dying oak. He offers to complete the job and warns Jill to move away from the tree's potential path.  In a standoff of wills, Jill refuses to move as Paul continues to chop at the tree.  The falling tree crushes Jill, and she dies.

As spring begins, Ellen sells the farm, and she and Paul set off to start a new life together.  Knowing that she is silently mourning the loss of Jill, Paul assures Ellen that she will be happy in her new life.  Sadly and uncertainly, she asks, "Will I?"

Cast
 Sandy Dennis as Jill Banford 
 Anne Heywood as Ellen March 
 Keir Dullea as Paul Grenfel

Production
In adapting Lawrence's novella for the screen, Lewis John Carlino and Howard Koch opted to change the setting from 1918 England to contemporary Canada in an effort to make the plot more relevant for late-1960s audiences.

The film was shot on location on a farm in Laskay, Ontario and at Cinespace Film Studios in Kleinburg, Ontario.

The song "That Night," with music by Lalo Schifrin and lyrics by Norman Gimbel, is performed by Sally Stevens.

The film was released soon after the dissolution of the Motion Picture Association of America Production Code and includes scenes of nudity, masturbation, sexual activity involving Paul and Ellen, and physical relations between two females. Rated R at the time of its original release, it was re-edited and rated PG in 1973.

Critical reception
Renata Adler of The New York Times called the film "a good and interesting movie" and continued, "The pace and the quality of the color, muted and unnatural, with many scenes photographed in shadows of various kinds, convey a brooding sense of something not quite right with everyone, rather like the tone of Reflections in a Golden Eye."

Roger Ebert of the Chicago Sun-Times called the film "a quiet, powerful masterpiece" and added, "Do not go to see The Fox because of its subject matter, and do not stay away for that reason. The scenes which disturbed Chicago's reactionary censors are filmed with quiet taste and an intuitive knowledge of human nature. And they are only a small part of a wholly natural film. Indeed, it is the natural ease of the film that is so appealing . . . The delicately constructed atmosphere of cold and snow, of early sunsets and chill lingering in the corners, establishes the tone . . . Miss Dennis has a difficult role [that] . . . could have become ridiculous, but [she] manages it well. Dullea is also stronger than he has been in other recent performances. Since David and Lisa, he has been trapped into playing a series of insecure, weak characters; this time, as the dominant personality, he is altogether successful. And he meets his match in Miss Heywood."

TV Guide called it "an uneven adaptation of D.H. Lawrence's novella" and rated it three out of five stars.

Box office
The Fox was the fifth most popular film in general release in Britain in 1968.

Accolades

The film is recognized by American Film Institute in these lists:
 2002: AFI's 100 Years...100 Passions – Nominated

Soundtrack

The film score was composed, arranged and conducted by Lalo Schifrin and the soundtrack album was released on the Warner Bros. label in 1968. The main theme has since acquired notoriety in France as the music for Dim tights commercials.

Track listing
All compositions by Lalo Schifrin except as indicated
 "Theme from the Fox" – 2:26 
 "Frost Trees" – 2:19 
 "Soft Clay" – 1:58 
 "Ellen's Image" – 3:27 
 "Dead Leaf" – 2:50 
 "Foxhole" – 2:11 
 "That Night" (Schifrin, Norman Gimbel) – 2:39 
 "Foxtail" – 2:11 
 "Paul's Memories" – 2:04 
 "Roll It Over" (Schifrin, Gimbel) – 2:17 
 "Trembling" – 2:40 
 "Lonely Road" – 2:04 
 "Dripping Icicles" – 3:02

Personnel
Lalo Schifrin – arranger, conductor
Vincent DeRosa, Richard Perissi – French horn
Sheridon Stokes, Louise Dissman – flute
John Neufeld – clarinet
William Criss – oboe
William Herzberg – bassoon
Artie Kane, Caesar Giovannini – piano
Tommy Tedesco – guitar
Ken Watson, Joe Porcaro, Emil Richards – percussion
Erno Neufeld, Marvin Limonick – violin
Myra Kestenbaum – viola
Raphael Kramer – cello
Dorothy Remsen – harp
Sally Stevens (track 7), Anne Heywood (track 10) – vocals 
Lloyd Basham – orchestra manager

Obscenity claims
The film was the subject of McGrew v. City of Jackson, Mississippi, a federal case on the constitutionality of the state of Mississippi’s obscenity statute. The statute prohibited any “exhibit to public view on a screen or otherwise, any obscene, indecent, or immoral picture.” In 1968, two police officers and the city prosecuting attorney as paid guests visited a local theater in Jackson during a showing of The Fox. At the conclusion of the showing, the police officers arrested the theater owner, Irene McGrew, and seized the entire film without any warrant of arrest or seizure. The Mississippi statute, however, authorizes an officer to make an arrest at any time without a warrant for a misdemeanor committed in his presence.

McGrew appealed the conviction, claiming that the Mississippi statute violated the first and fourteenth amendments of the United States Constitution which guarantees freedom of expression. In a 2-1 vote, the judges of the United States District Court for the Southern District of Mississippi upheld the conviction, saying the statute was constitutional. The majority said, "The dominant theme of The Fox film is sex in a raw state in a product which the producers have attempted to whitewash and clean up just sufficiently to possibly escape condemnation as utter filth." The dissenting judge said, "I think that the applicable Mississippi obscenity statute fails to meet the constitutional requirements of the first and fourteenth amendments guaranteeing freedom of expression."

References

External links

1967 films
1967 drama films
1967 LGBT-related films
Canadian drama films
Canadian LGBT-related films
Bisexuality-related films
1967 directorial debut films
English-language Canadian films
Films scored by Lalo Schifrin
Films based on short fiction
Films based on works by D. H. Lawrence
Films directed by Mark Rydell
Films about farmers
Films set in Canada
Films set on farms
Films shot in Ontario
Lesbian-related films
Films with screenplays by Lewis John Carlino
Films with screenplays by Howard Koch (screenwriter)
1960s English-language films
1960s Canadian films